"Turn" is a song by Welsh rock band Feeder, released as the third single from their third studio album, Echo Park (2001), on 2 July 2001. The song reached number 27 in the UK Singles Chart and led to Echo Park re-entering the top 75 due to the pre-release airplay and stocking of the single on release week. It was also the band's third successive top-30 single, the first time this had happened in their career.

The track called "Come Back Around" on CD1 is not the same song as the single from Comfort in Sound, released a year later, but a different song. When "Come Back Around" was mentioned as a new single, there was an initial confusion among fans thinking it was a new version of the same song. The title track related to Grant Nicholas's experiences of being away while on tour.

Track listings

UK CD1
 "Turn" (full length version) – 4:38
 "Come Back Around" – 3:26
 "Bring It Home" – 3:59
 "Turn" (video)

UK CD2
 "Turn" (radio edit) – 3:58
 "Bad Hair Day" – 2:03
 The making of Echo Park (video and audio track) – 7:00

UK cassette single
 "Turn" (radio edit) – 3:58
 "Bring It Home" – 3:59
 "San Diego" – 3:26

UK limited-edition 7-inch purple vinyl single
A. "Turn" (radio edit) – 3:58
B. "Come Back Around" – 3:26

Charts

References

Feeder songs
2001 singles
The Echo Label singles
Rock ballads
Song recordings produced by Gil Norton
Songs written by Grant Nicholas
UK Independent Singles Chart number-one singles